The 1904 Rhode Island gubernatorial election was held on November 8, 1904. Republican nominee George H. Utter defeated Democratic incumbent Lucius F. C. Garvin with 48.94% of the vote.

General election

Candidates
Major party candidates
George H. Utter, Republican
Lucius F. C. Garvin, Democratic

Other candidates
William E. Brightman, Prohibition
John Edward Carney, Socialist
Peter McDermott, Socialist Labor

Results

References

1904
Rhode Island
Gubernatorial